Ivanka Matić (Serbian Cyrillic: Иванка Матић; born 29 May 1979 in Vlasenica, SFR Yugoslavia) is a Serbian professional basketball player. She plays as a center for the Tarbes Gespe Bigorre in Ligue Féminine. Ivanka is a former member of Serbia women's national basketball team.

Clubs

Honours
Euroleague Women
Winner: 2006–07 with Spartak Moscow

Russia Championship
Winner: 2007 with Spartak Moscow

Czech Republic Championship
Winner: 2009 with USK Prague

References

External links
Profile at eurobasket.com
Profile at Fiba Europe website

1979 births
Living people
People from Vlasenica
Serbian women's basketball players
Serbs of Bosnia and Herzegovina
Centers (basketball)
ŽKK Partizan players
ŽKK Crvena zvezda players
Tarbes Gespe Bigorre players
Galatasaray S.K. (women's basketball) players
Club Sportiv Municipal Târgoviște players
Serbian expatriate basketball people in France
Serbian expatriate basketball people in Russia
Serbian expatriate basketball people in Spain
Serbian expatriate basketball people in the Czech Republic
Serbian expatriate basketball people in Turkey
Serbian expatriate basketball people in Romania
Serbian expatriate basketball people in Belgium